John Nicholaas Rep (born 25 November 1951) is a Dutch former professional footballer who played as a right winger. He holds the all-time record for FIFA World Cup goals for the Netherlands with 7.

Playing career 
Rep played as a right-footed striker in the Dutch World Cup teams of 1974 (West Germany) and 1978 (Argentina). He scored the winning goal for Ajax Amsterdam against Juventus in the 1973 European Cup Final in Belgrade and also helped SC Bastia reach the finals of the 1978 UEFA Cup.

After his time in Bastia, Rep joined AS Saint-Étienne and was part of a side that included Michel Platini.

Honours 
Ajax
 Eredivisie: 1971–72, 1972–73
 European Cup: 1971–72, 1972–73
 European Super Cup: 1972, 1973
 Intercontinental Cup: 1972

Bastia
 UEFA Cup runner-up: 1978

Saint-Étienne
 French League Championship: 1980–81

Netherlands
 FIFA World Cup runner-up: 1974, 1978
 UEFA European Championship third place: 1976

Individual
 French Division 1 Foreign Player of the Year: 1977–78

Trivia 
Rep is included in the "Classic Netherlands" team in the football video game Pro Evolution Soccer 6 under the name of "Rak".

Rep is the namesake of the Irish indie pop band Jonny Rep. He also has a song in his honour, written by French rock band Mickey 3D, who hail from Saint Etienne.

References

External links 
 Johnny Rep at Voetbal International 
 
 

1951 births
Living people
Footballers from Zaanstad
Dutch footballers
Association football forwards
Association football wingers
AFC Ajax players
Valencia CF players
La Liga players
SC Bastia players
AS Saint-Étienne players
PEC Zwolle players
HFC Haarlem players
Feyenoord players
Eredivisie players
Ligue 1 players
Dutch expatriate footballers
Expatriate footballers in Spain
Expatriate footballers in France
Dutch expatriate sportspeople in Spain
Dutch expatriate sportspeople in France
Netherlands international footballers
1974 FIFA World Cup players
UEFA Euro 1976 players
1978 FIFA World Cup players
UEFA Euro 1980 players
Dutch football managers
UEFA Champions League winning players